The Rugby League Regional Leagues are a group of regional leagues at the bottom of the British rugby league pyramid consisting of teams from England, Scotland, and Wales.

References

Rugby league in the United Kingdom
Rugby league competitions in the United Kingdom